En Busca del Amor (In Searching for Love) is the fourteenth studio album by Salvadoran singer Álvaro Torres, released on April 30, 1996 through EMI Latin. The album was produced by himself and Nelson Gonzalez and recorded in five different studios.

Track listing

Personnel 
Credits adapted from En Busca del Amor liner notes.

Vocals

 Álvaro Torres – lead vocals
 Tito Allen – backing vocals
 Wichy Camacho – backing vocals
Leyla Hoyle – backing vocals
Alejandro Enrique Martínez – backing vocals
Kenny OBrian – backing vocals
Isela Sotelo – backing vocals

Musicians

 Carmelo Alvarez – bells, bongos
César Benítez – arrangements, keyboards
Luis Conte – percussion
George Doering – acoustic guitar
Joan Elardo – oboe
Ramon Flores – trumpet
Domingo Garcia – piano
Barbie Insua – art direction
Peter Kent – concert master
Brad Kintschner – french horn
Michael Landau – electric guitar
Elías Lopés – trumpet
Ángel "Angie" Machado – trumpet
Chago Martínez – percussion, timbales
Enrique Martinez – accordion
Jimmy Morales – congas
Joel Peskin – tenor saxophone, alto saxophone
John "J.R." Robinson – drums
John Rosenberg – strings
Martin Santiago – bass
Ramón Stagnaro – acoustic guitar
Neil Stubenhaus – bass
Raffi Torres – trombone
Arturo Velasco – trombone
Amy Wilkins – harp

Art design

 Héctor Sandoval – design

Production

 Álvaro Torres – production
Nelson Gonzalez – production, art supervising
Arturo Reyna – engineering
Ronnie Torres – engineering
 Benny Faccone – mixing
 Christina Abaroa – production coordination
César Benítez – programming
Jordan d'Alessio – engineering assistance
Peter Doell – engineering assistance
Leslie Ann Jones – engineering assistance
Doug Michael – engineering assistance
Jennifer Monnar – engineering assistance
Cesar Ramirez – engineering assistance

Recording

 Recorded in Capitol Recording Studios, Hollywood, CA; Conway Recording Studios, Hollywood, CA; Ocean Way Recording Studios, Hollywood, CA; Power Light Studio, San Juan, Puerto Rico; Sound About, Van Nuys, CA.

References 

1996 albums
Álvaro Torres albums